Krishna Mukherjee (born 12 August 1992) is an Indian actress who mainly works in Hindi television. She made her acting debut in 2014 with Jhalli Anjali where she played Sheena. Mukherjee is best known for portraying Aliya Raghav Bhalla in Yeh Hai Mohabbatein, Priya Rehan Singhania in Kuch Toh Hai: Naagin Ek Naye Rang Mein and Shagun Shinde Jaiswal in Shubh Shagun.

Early and Personal life
Mukherjee was born on 12 August 1992 in Ludhiana, Punjab to Vishwaroop Mukherjee and Ruby Mukherjee.

On 8 September 2022, Mukherjee got engaged in Manali to her longtime boyfriend Chirag Batliwalla, a Parsi sailor who is in Indian Merchant Navy. On 13 March 2023, they got married in Goa.

Career
Mukherjee debuted with Jhalli Anjali as Sheela. She then appeared in Yeh Hai Aashiqui as Sanjana on Bindass opposite Reyansh Bhatia, and in Twist Wala Love as Arshiya.

Mukherjee joined Ekta Kapoor's Yeh Hai Mohabbatein, a Star Plus programme, in 2016 as Aliya opposite Abhishek Verma and Abhishek Malik, which proved to be her breakthrough role. Simultaneously, she also signed a negative role in Kapoor's another production, a supernatural fiction series Naagin 3, where she appeared in its last few episodes. She entered the show in May 2019 as Taamsi.

After the culmination of Yeh Hai Mohabbatein in December 2019, Mukherjee took a small hiatus from acting.

In January 2021, Kuch Toh Hai: Naagin Ek Naye Rang Mein, shortly known as Kuch Toh Hai, a spin-off of Naagin 5, was announced.

In 2022, she was seen as Priya Singhania opposite Harsh Rajput. She also worked in Dangal's Shubh Shagun opposite Shehzada Dhami.

Filmography

Television

Music videos

References

External links

1992 births
Living people
People from Ludhiana
21st-century Indian actresses
Indian television actresses